Todos Éxitos is the first greatest hits album from Argentine singer Diego Torres released on September 23, 2008 through Sony Music. The compilation was released in two different formats, including a one disc edition and a CD+DVD edition.

Track listing

Chart performance

References

2008 greatest hits albums
Diego Torres compilation albums
Spanish-language compilation albums
2008 video albums
Music video compilation albums
Sony Music Latin compilation albums
Sony Music Latin video albums